Charlotte County Courthouse may refer to:

Charlotte County Court House, St. Andrews, New Brunswick, Canada
Charlotte County Courthouse (Virginia), listed on the NRHP in Virginia
Old Charlotte County Courthouse, Punta Gorda, Florida, United States